28thAnnie Awards
November 11, 2000

Best Animated Feature: 
Toy Story 2

Best Primetime Television Program: 
The Simpsons

Best Daytime Television Program: 
Mickey Mouse Works

Best Home Video Production: 
An Extremely Goofy Movie

Best Short Subject: 
For the Birds

The 28th Annie Awards were given by the International Animated Film Association, ASIFA-Hollywood to honor outstanding achievements in the field of animation in 2000. This was the final year before the Best Animated Feature award was introduced at the Academy Awards.

Production categories 

Winners are listed first, highlighted in boldface, and indicated with a double dagger.
{| class=wikitable width=80%
|-
| valign="top" width="30%"|

 Toy Story 2 – Pixar/Walt Disney Pictures 
 Chicken Run – Pathé, Aardman and DreamWorks SKG
 Fantasia 2000 – Walt Disney Pictures
 The Road to El Dorado – DreamWorks SKG
 Titan A.E. – 20th Century Fox Animation
| valign="top" width="30%"|

 The Simpsons – Gracie Films in association with 20th Century Fox Television Dexter's Laboratory – Hanna-Barbera Cartoons
 Futurama – The Curiosity Co. and 20th Century Fox Television
 The PJ's – Imagine Television, Will Vinton Studios
 Spy Groove – MTV Animation
|-
| valign="top" width="30%"|

 An Extremely Goofy Movie – Walt Disney Television Animation Bartok the Magnificent – 20th Century Fox Television
 Mickey's Once Upon a Christmas – Walt Disney Television Animation
 Scooby-Doo! and the Witch's Ghost – Hanna-Barbera Cartoons, Warner Bros. Animation
 Steven Spielberg Presents Wakko's Wish – Warner Bros. Animation
| valign="top" width="30%"|

 Mickey Mouse Works – Walt Disney Television Animation The Angry Beavers – Nickelodeon Animation Studio
 Recess – Walt Disney Television Animation
 Batman Beyond – Warner Bros. Animation
 Warner Bros' Histeria! – Warner Bros. Television Animation
|-
| valign="top" width="30%"|

 For the Birds – Pixar Ghost of Stephen Foster – Matthew Nastuk and Raymond S. Persi
 John Henry  – Walt Disney Pictures
 Little Go Beep  – Warner Bros. Classic Animation
 Quick Draw El Kabong  – Wild Brain, Inc.
| valign="top" width="30%"|

 Genie – Old Navy, Mirinda Will Vinton Studios About Face  – Crayola, Acme Filmworks, Inc.
 Carpool  – Village Pantry Renegade Animation, Inc.
 Elves – Web TV, Acme Filmworks, Inc.
 Playa's Delight  – Kevin Garnett, Nike, Wild Brain, Inc.
|-
| valign="top" width="30%"|

 The Scooby-Doo Project – Cartoon Network'''
 The Bob Clampett Show  – Cartoon Network
 Pajama Party – Wild Brain, Inc.
 The Jeffersons' "Starship  – Image Spot,  Nickelodeon, Nick at Nite
| valign="top" width="30%"|

 'Elmo Aardvark, Outer Space Detective – Renegade Animation, Inc. Hairballs  – Film Roman, Level13.net
 Bill Bilkman "Getting Rich While Working From Home"  – The Romp Inc.
 Space is Dum Episode 11 "Gay Monkey Mummy Part 2" – wildbrain.com, Inc.
|}

 Outstanding individual achievements in Film 

 Outstanding individual achievements in Television 

 Juried Awards Winsor McCay Award Recognition for career contributions to the art of animation
 Norman McCabeWith a career spanning more than sixty-five years, Norm McCabe has worked for many animation studios, including Hanna-Barbera, Filmation, DePatie-Freleng, Marvel and Warner Bros. Television Animation, but he is perhaps best known for his tenure as animator and director at the Leon Schlesinger Looney Tunes Studio in the 1930s and 40s.
 Hoyt CurtinAs a composer and music director for Hanna-Barbera from the 1950s to the 1990s, Hoyt Curtain created the music for some of television's memorable theme songs, including those for The Flintstones, The Jetsons, Top Cat and Jonny Quest.
 Lucille BlissOne of the most versatile voice actresses in the business, Lucille Bliss has vocally created hundreds of characters, most notable Crusader Rabbit—television's first animated star—and Smurfette in The Smurfs.June Foray Award Recognition of benevolent/charitable impact on the art and industry of animation
 Linda SimenskyCertificate of Merit Recognition for service to the art, craft and industry of animation
 Jerry Beck
 Mark Zavad
 Bob MillerTechnical Achievement Walking with DinosaursSpecial Achievement in Animation' Recognition of unique and outstanding achievement in animation
 Bob Clampett's Beany and Cecil The Special Edition'', Robert Clampett, Jr.

External links
 
 Annie Awards 2000 at Internet Movie Database

2000
2000 film awards
Annie
Annie